Aleksandr Aleksandrovich Orekhov (born 29 November 1983) is a Russian football coach and a former player. He is an assistant coach with FC Krasnodar.

Playing career
Plagued by injury, Orekhov has not played since October 2010, returning to training in early 2014.

Coaching career
Since 12 August 2019, Aleksandr Orekhov is the manager of resurrected FC Kuban Krasnodar.

References

External links
  Player page on the official FC Rubin Kazan website
 

1983 births
People from Bryansk Oblast
Living people
Russian footballers
Russia under-21 international footballers
Association football defenders
FC Arsenal Kyiv players
FC Kuban Krasnodar players
FC Rubin Kazan players
FC Tom Tomsk players
Russian expatriate footballers
Expatriate footballers in Ukraine
Russian Premier League players
Ukrainian Premier League players
Russian football managers
Sportspeople from Bryansk Oblast